The Bosniak Corps was a Prussian Army unit of lancers of Bosnian origin.  In 1745 they were organised in the 1st Hussar Regiment "von Ruesch".

History 
The army has frequently performed functions of a Gendarmerie, or as the military police of the modern military. Bosniak army soldiers wore distinctive, high fur hats, decorated pony tails and ropes, they wore emblems of the province in which they served. As for weapons, they used their swords and spears, as well as their counterparts in the Imperial Army - Cossacks.

The first time they fought was during the Seven Years' War, and numbered nearly 1,000 people. Later, during the war because of the Bavarian allocations, as well as in Kostyuk uprising in 1796.

Origin 
The ethnic composition of the Prussian Bosniaks has not been finally clarified. Originally, it was assumed in the literature that they were all Bosnians because of the name , i.e. they came from Bosnia and were exclusively or predominantly Muslim Bosnians. Subsequent statements contradict this: Serkis' troops were of Bosnian, Albanian, Turkish, Polish and Tatar origin or there were no Bosnians at all.

Other armies 
Bosniaks were also in the Polish army in the first half of the 18th century. However, the Bosniaks led a marginal existence alongside the Uhlans, who were part of the Polish military at the same time .
Bosniaks are also mentioned as lancers in the Danish hussars. There, based on the Prussian model, a squadron of lancers was equipped with similarly fantastic uniforms. The Prussian Bosniaks were also a model for the Netherlands when they set up the "Bosnian Uhlans" (Bosniaques) as a lancer formation.

Literature 
 Zemaljski muzej Bosne i Hercegovine, Wissenschaftliche Mitteilungen aus Bosnien und der Herzegowina Band 8, Das Museum, 1902
 David v. Dziengel: Geschichte des Königlichen Zweiten Ulanen-Regiments: zugleich enthaltend: Die Geschichte der Towarczys von 1675; die Geschichte der Bosniaken von 1745; des Tartaren-Pulks von 1795; der Towarczys von 1800, [...], Potsdam 1858. Digitalisat der ULB Düsseldorf

References

See also 
Bosnian-Herzegovinian Infantry
Ulanen
Volontaires de Saxe
Towarzysz
Pocztowy

Units and formations of the Prussian Army
Military history of Poland
Cavalry